Myristica ovicarpa is a species of plant in the family Myristicaceae. It is endemic to Papua New Guinea.

References

Flora of Papua New Guinea
ovicarpa
Vulnerable plants
Taxonomy articles created by Polbot